The Honda Invitational was a golf tournament on the Asian Tour that was held in Thailand in 1996 and 1997. The tournament was won, respectively, by Steve Elkington and Tiger Woods.

The 1997 event received far more media attention due to the presence of Woods, who received a reported $480,000 appearance fee, which was more than the total prize fund of the tournament. However his management company, IMG, expressed that the reason Woods attended the event was because his mother is from Thailand. When he arrived at the airport there were 1,000 people waiting for him and four of the country's five television stations carried his arrival live. After an opening round of 70 (−2) that put him three shots behind, Woods shot 64-66-68 over the last three days to win by ten strokes.

Winners

References

Former Asian Tour events
Golf tournaments in Thailand